Ainbai is a Papuan language of Sandaun Province, Papua New Guinea. It is spoken in Ainbai village, Bewani/Wutung Onei Rural LLG, Sandaun Province.

Other than Ainbai village, it is also spoken in Elis village.

References

Border languages (New Guinea)
Languages of Sandaun Province
Severely endangered languages